The Premios 40 Principales for Best Costa Rican Act was presented annually at Los Premios 40 Principales between 2007 and 2011. It was discontinued due to the creation of Los Premios 40 Principales América, reemerging as part of them in 2014.

References

2011 music awards